This is a list of the first minority male lawyer(s) and judge(s) in Illinois. It includes the year in which the men were admitted to practice law (in parentheses). Also included are other distinctions such as the first minority men in their state to graduate from law school or become a political figure.

Firsts in state history

Lawyers 

Lloyd Garrison Wheeler (1869): First African American male admitted to the Illinois State Bar. However, he relocated soon after to Arkansas.
Antonio Rosas Sarabia (1950): First Mexican American male lawyer in Illinois
Theodore "Ted" Burtzos: First deaf male lawyer to argue a case before a jury in Illinois

State judges 

 Albert B. George: First African American male judge in Illinois (1924)
David Cerda: First Latino American male judge in Illinois (1965) and serve on the Illinois Appellate Court (1989)
George N. Leighton (1947): First African American male to serve on the First District Appellate Court in Illinois (1969)
 Charles E. Freeman (1962): First African American male to serve on the Illinois Supreme Court (1990) and serve as its Chief Justice
 F. Keith Brown (1981): First African American male judge to serve as a Chief Judge in the Sixteenth Judicial District Court (Kane County, Illinois; 1991)
Thomas R. Chiola (1974): First openly LGBT male judge in Illinois (1994)
Sebastian Patti: First openly LGBT male to serve as an appellate court judge in Illinois (1995)
Theodore "Ted" Burtzos: First deaf male judge in Illinois (1995)
Kenneth Moy: First Asian American male judge in Illinois (1996)
Israel Desierto: First Filipino American male judge in Illinois (2005)
Jesse Reyes (1982): First Latino American male elected as a Judge of the Illinois Appellate Court (2012)
Rouhy J. Shalabi: First Palestinian American and Muslim American judge in Illinois (2020)
Sanjay Tailor: First Asian American male to serve as a presiding judge in Illinois (2021)

Federal judges 
James Benton Parsons (1949): First African American male to serve on the U.S. District Court for the Northern District of Illinois (1961)
Alexander J. Napoli: First Italian American male to serve on the United States District Court for the Northern District of Illinois (1966)
Joe Billy McDade (1963): First African American male to serve on the U.S. District Court for the Central District of Illinois (1991)
Ruben Castillo (1979): First Latino American male to serve on the U.S. District Court for the Northern District of Illinois (1994)
Manuel Barbosa: First Hispanic American male bankruptcy judge to serve in the U.S. Northern District of Illinois (1998)
Samuel Der-Yeghiayan (1978): First Armenian immigrant male to serve on the U.S. District Court for the Northern District of Illinois (2003)
Edmond E. Chang: First Asian American (male) to serve on the United States District Court for the Northern District of Illinois (2011)
James Shadid: First Arab American male to serve on the United States District Court for the Central District of Illinois (2011)
John Z. Lee (1992): First Korean American male to serve on the United States District Court for the Northern District of Illinois (2012)
Manish S. Shah (1998): First Indian American male to serve on the U.S. District Court for the Northern District of Illinois (2014)
Sunil R. Harjani: First South Asian male to serve as a Judge of the U.S. District Court for the Northern District of Illinois (2019)
Franklin U. Valderrama: First Panamanian American male to serve as a Judge of the U.S. District Court for the Northern District of Illinois (2020)

Attorney General 

Roland Burris (1963): First African American male elected as the Attorney General of Illinois (1991-1995)

Assistant Attorney General 

 James G. Gotter: First African American male to serve as the Assistant Attorney General of Illinois (1917)

United States Attorney 

 Gregory K. Harris: First African American male to serve as the United States Attorney for the Central District of Illinois (2021)

State's Attorney 

 James R. Burgess, Jr.: First African American male to serve as the State's Attorney in Illinois (1972)

Assistant State's Attorney 

 Ferdinand Lee Barnett: First African American male to serve as an Assistant State's Attorney in Illinois (1896)

Bar Association 

 Lawrence X. Pusateri: First Italian American male to serve as the President of the Illinois State Bar Association (1975)
 Vincent Cornelius: First African American male to serve as the Illinois State Bar Association (2016)

Firsts in local history 

 K. Patrick Yarbrough: First African American male judge in Boone and Winnebago Counties, Illinois (2008)
 Chester Blair: First African American male to serve as the President of the Chicago Bar Association [Cook and DuPage Counties, Illinois]
 René A. Torrado, Jr.: First Latino American male to serve as the President of the Chicago Bar Association (1995) [Cook and DuPage Counties, Illinois]
 Moses Suarez: First Latino American male to serve as President of the Lesbian and Gay Bar Association of Chicago (2019) [Cook and DuPage Counties, Illinois]
 Joe Somers: First African American male to serve as the Justice of the Peace in Champaign County, Illinois (1961)
 James R. Burgess, Jr.: First African American male to serve as the State's Attorney of Champaign County, Illinois (1972)
 Richard A. Dawson (1870): First African American male to graduate from the University of Chicago's law department
 Cecil A. Partee: First African American male to serve as the State's Attorney of Cook County, Illinois
 James Chelos: First Greek American male elected as a judge in Cook County, Illinois (1952)
 James Benton Parsons (1949): First African American male to serve as a Judge of the Superior Court of Cook County, Illinois (1959)
 Israel Desierto: First Filipino American male to serve as an Associate Judge of the Circuit Court of Cook County, Illinois (2005)
 Sanjay Tailor: First Indian American male appointed as an Associate Judge in Cook County, Illinois
 Kenneth Moy: First Asian American male appointed as Judge of the DuPage County Circuit Court (1996)
 Charles Willner (1876): First Jewish male lawyer in Burlington, Illinois [Kane County, Illinois]
 F. Keith Brown (1981): First African American male judge and Chief Judge in the Sixteenth Judicial District (Kane County, Illinois; 1991)
 John Dalton: First openly LGBT male judge in Kane County, Illinois (2012)
 Rene Cruz: First Hispanic American male to serve as an associate judge in Kane County, Illinois (2012)
 George Bridges (1987): First African American male judge in Lake County, Illinois
 Jorge L. Ortiz (1989): First Hispanic American male judge in Lake County, Illinois (2002) and first Chief Judge (2016)
 Clayton R. Williams (c. 1940s): First African American male lawyer in Madison County, Illinois. He would later become a judge.
 Mario J. Perez: First Latino American male lawyer in McHenry County, Illinois
 Carlos S. Arevalo: First Hispanic American to serve as the President of the McHenry County Bar Association, Illinois (2014)
 Abraham Morris Williams: First African American male lawyer in Sangamon County, Illinois
 David Garcia: First Latino American male judge in Will County, Illinois (2013)

See also 

 List of first minority male lawyers and judges in the United States

Other topics of interest 

 List of first women lawyers and judges in the United States
 List of first women lawyers and judges in Illinois

References 

 
Minority, Illinois, first
Minority, Illinois, first
Lists of people from Illinois
Illinois lawyers
law